This is intended to be a complete list of properties and districts listed on the National Register of Historic Places in Ellis County, Texas. There are seven districts, 114 individual properties, and one former property listed on the National Register in the county. Nine individually listed properties are also Recorded Texas Historic Landmarks including one that is also a State Antiquities Landmark while four districts contain additional Recorded Texas Historic Landmarks and one State Antiquities Landmark.

Current listings

The locations of National Register properties and districts may be seen in a mapping service provided.

|}

Former listing

|}

See also

National Register of Historic Places listings in Texas
Recorded Texas Historic Landmarks in Ellis County

References

External links

Registered Historic Places
Ellis County